Bekiralanı is a village in Toroslar district of Mersin Province where the capital city of Toroslar district is actually a part of Greater Mersin.The distance to Mersin city center is  . It is situated in the Taurus Mountains .  At  it is almost merged to the Soğucak a town at the south of Bekiralanı. The population of village was 390  as of 2012. The village is a yayla (summer resort) of Mersin.

References

Villages in Toroslar District